Sonagazi is an upazila (sub-district) of Feni District in the Division of Chittagong, Bangladesh.

Geography
It has 37,184 households and a total area of 235.07 km2.

It is situated in the southern part of the district, the only Upazila to have a coastline with the Bay of Bengal. Sonagazi is noted for its natural environment, and a sluice gate, known as "Muhuri Project", built in the late 1970s to control water flow of the Feni river is a tourist destination.

Demographics
According to the 1991 Bangladesh census, Sonagazi had a population of 215,122, of whom 99,050 were aged 18 or over. Males constituted 49.8% of the population, and females 50.2%. Sonagazi has an average literacy rate of 32.2% (7+ years), against the national average of 32.4%.

Administration
Sonagazi Upazila is divided into Sonagazi Municipality and nine union parishads: Amirabad, Bogadana, Charmozlishpur, Chardorbesh, Chorchandia, Mongolkandi, Motigonj, Nababpur, and Sonagazi. The union parishads are subdivided into 94 mauzas and 95 villages.

Sonagazi Municipality is subdivided into 9 wards and 14 mahallas.

Notable residents
 Zahir Raihan, filmmaker, was born at Majupur village in 1935.
 Shahidullah Kaiser, writer, was born at Majupur village in 1927.
 Selim Al Deen, playwright, was born at Shenerkhil village in 1949.
 Amin Ahmed Chowdhury, Bangladeshi Army Officer and Freedom Fighter. 
 Md. Mosharraf Hossain - industrialist and former MP
 Lt. Gen. Masud Uddin Chowdhury, ndc, psc, MP and Diplomat 
 Shomi Kaiser, actress 
 Rokeya Prachy, actress 
 Mahbubul Alam Tara was the Member of Parliament from constituency Feni-3 from 1991 until 1996.

See also
 Upazilas of Bangladesh
 Districts of Bangladesh
 Divisions of Bangladesh

References

Upazilas of Feni District